Su e giù ( Up and down) is a 1965 Italian anthology comedy film directed by Mino Guerrini.

Cast
Guido Alberti	(segment "Colpo da leoni, Il")
Béatrice Altariba	(segment "Questione di principio")
Paola Biggio as Cuccio's Wife (segment "Questione di Principo")
Maria Grazia Buccella as La signora
Lando Buzzanca as Cuccio (segment "Questione di Principo")
Bianca Castagnetta (segment " Il Colpo Del Leone")
Alida Chelli as The young lady
Umberto Felici	(segment " Il Colpo Del Leone")
Paolo Ferrari as Giorgio (segment " Il Marito D'Agosto")
Mino Guerrini (segment "Questione di Principo")
Luigi Leoni (segment " Il Colpo Del Leone")
Antonella Lualdi as Evi (segment "il marito d'agosto")
Marc Michel as Baldovino Uberti (segment " Il Colpo Del Leone")
Eleonora Rossi Drago as Violante Persici (segment " Il Colpo Del Leone")
Enrico Maria Salerno as Enrico (segment "Questione di Principo")
Aldo Tonti	(segment "Questione di Principo")
Luigi Vannucchi as Doctor Lanfranchi (segment "Questione di Principo")
Daniele Vargas	as Professor Maestrelli (segment "Questione di Principo")

External links
 

1965 films
1960s Italian-language films
Films directed by Mino Guerrini
Italian anthology films
Italian comedy films
1965 comedy films
1960s Italian films